Bigpoint GmbH is a German video game developer. The company develops stand-alone browser-based games as well as social network games. Bigpoint has over 200 million registered users (announced in June 2011). Bigpoint.com states that  337,104,419 players are registered in the top right corner, as of 10/10/13. NBCU has featured some of Bigpoint's games on the websites of some of its cable channels.

In addition to its headquarters in Hamburg, Germany, Bigpoint maintains offices in Berlin, San Francisco, Malta and São Paulo. Some of the company's games include Battlestar Galactica Online, Farmerama, Drakensang Online, DarkOrbit and Seafight.  The studio was acquired by Youzu Interactive in 2016 and continues to operate as an independent subsidiary.

History
In 2002, the company was founded by Heiko Hubertz as m.wire GmbH in Hamburg, Germany's second largest city. Heiko Hubertz started this company with a football management game in which every player transfer would cost a small amount for famous football players. Bigpoint's first game was Icefighter, an ice hockey management simulation. Till the end of 2004 there were further games launched,  "F1Manager" and "Fussballmanager" (Football Manager in German). In 2005 the company was renamed to e-sport GmbH. In 2006 Samwer brothers with European Founders Fund and beginning of 2007 United Internet invested in the company. 
The company quickly expanded, having one million registered users in 2006. By 2007, Bigpoint was running 22 browser games. 
 
In June 2008, General Electric and NBC Universal, along with European private-equity group GMT Communications Partners, bought out a 70 percent share of Bigpoint, leaving the remaining 30 percent share under Heiko Hubertz's control.

By 2009, Bigpoint reached more than 100 million users and had a revenue of more than 50 million Euros.

On April 26, 2011, TA Associates and Summit Partners invested $350 million into Bigpoint to become the majority shareholders. On May 16, 2011, Bigpointdotcom posted a video on YouTube.com announcing their new office building.  Previous shareholders Comcast Interactive Capital's Peacock Equity Fund sold their holdings in this transaction. GMT Communications Partners and GE sold a majority of their stakes. Hubertz retained his existing ownership stake in the company.

In May 2011, Bigpoint had more than 800 employees worldwide.

On October 23, 2012, Bigpoint laid off 120 staff members. At the same time Heiko Hubertz stepped down as CEO.

In March 2016, the developer was acquired by Youzu Interactive (GTArcade) in an €80 million ($89.68 million) stock buyout.

Used technology

Games are developed using PHP, Adobe Flash, Java and the Unity engine.

List of games developed by Bigpoint

 Pirate Storm
 Icefighter
 Fussballmanager
 Gangs of Crime (formerly known as Mafia 1930)
 Gladiatoren
 Managergames Hockey
 Managergames Soccer
 Seafight
 Land of Destruction
 DarkOrbit
 Chaoscars

 SpeedCars
 SpeedSpace
 The Pimps
 ActionLeague
 Damoria
 K.O. Champs
 Gladius II
 SpaceInvasion
 War of Titans
 BeBees
 Parsec

 Deepolis
 XBlaster
 Hellblades
 ZooMumba
 Battlestar Galactica Online
 SkyRama
 PonyRama
 RamaCity
 AquaRama
 FantasyRama
 Drakensang Online
 Kultan - The World Beyond
 The Mummy Online
 Universal Monsters Online
 Supremacy 1914
 Rising Cities
 PirateStorm

List of games published by Bigpoint

 WonderKing Online
 Drift City
 War Machines
 Terminator Salvation
 Rise of Gods

 Case White
 SpaceConquer
 Skaph (by Wadim Kapinos, a promotion from 2009 August)
 Rangersland International
 Pirates 1709 International

 Wanted
 11 Manager
 Arenas of Glory
 Castle Fight International
 Puzzle Pirates

 Xhodon
 Anophis
 Dolumar
 Generated Affixation: the Nexus Lancinate
 Gameglobe

References

External links
 Online Gaming Outfit Bigpoint Points To Some Big Numbers TechCrunch June 20, 2011
 The Next Wave of Free-to-Play: Licensing Gamasutra June 16, 2011
 Battlestar Galactica Online Surpasses 2 Million Players Jostiq May 26, 2011
 Investors buy majority stake in online game maker Bigpoint for $350M VentureBeat April 25, 2011
 Bigpoint Talks Drakensang Online Massively, March 21, 2011
 Bigpoint expands to US with Electronic Arts digital distribution deal VentureBeat February 28, 2011
 Bigpoint saves Planet Moon game studio with hiring binge VentureBeat January 1, 2011
 Bigpoint in €70 million buy-out, at www.growthbusiness.co.uk, June 9, 2008.
 Bigpoint’s Sale to NBC-GMT a Big Deal: Online gaming company fetches $110 million, signifying continued interest in the space from major media companies and ongoing consumer interest., By JONATHAN MARINO, Mergers & Acquisitions Report via mergersunleashed.com, June 9, 2008.
 Peacock, GMT agree to majority buyout of Bigpoint, siliconindia news bureau, June 12, 2008.
 GMT and NBC Universal take over Bigpoint, Galaxynews.com June 9, 2008.

Browser-based game websites
Browser-based multiplayer online games
Video game development companies
German companies established in 2002
Video game companies established in 2002
Video game companies of Germany
Companies based in Hamburg